Prince Vittorio Emanuele of Savoy, Prince of Naples (Vittorio Emanuele Alberto Carlo Teodoro Umberto Bonifacio Amedeo Damiano Bernardino Gennaro Maria di Savoia; born 12 February 1937) is the only son of Umberto II, the last King of Italy, and his wife Marie-José of Belgium. Vittorio Emanuele also uses the title Duke of Savoy and claims the headship of the House of Savoy. These claims were disputed by supporters of his third cousin, Prince Aimone, 6th Duke of Aosta.

He has lived for most of his life in exile, following the constitutional referendum of 1946 which affirmed the abolition of the monarchy and the creation of the Italian Republic. On several occasions he has been the centre of controversy in Italy and abroad due to a series of incidents, including remarks that were seen by some as anti-semitic. He was revealed to be a member of Propaganda Due (P2), the state within a state responsible for high-level corruption and political manipulation. In France he was tried on a murder charge, of which he was cleared of unlawful killing but convicted of a firearms offence. On 16 June 2006, following an investigation started by John Woodcock of the Public Prosecutor's Office in Potenza, Italy, Vittorio Emanuele was arrested on charges of criminal association, racketeering, conspiracy, corruption and exploitation of prostitution. A trial on these charges began in Potenza, Italy, on 21 December 2009. Vittorio Emanuele di Savoia was acquitted of all charges in 2007 and 2010.

Early life and family

Vittorio Emanuele was born 12 February 1937 in Naples to Umberto, Prince of Piedmont, who would later become the last King of Italy as Umberto II, and Princess Marie-José of Belgium. When Umberto II left Italy after the monarchy was abolished by the 1946 Italian institutional referendum, the remaining members of the House of Savoy lived in exile, mostly in Switzerland and on the Portuguese Riviera, though the former king Victor Emmanuel III, grandfather to Vittorio Emanuele, lived in Egypt until his death in 1947. Following the separation of the exiled ex-King and ex-Queen, Vittorio Emanuele lived with his mother in an estate in Merlinge, Switzerland. Vittorio Emanuele and his family currently reside in Geneva.

After an eleven-year relationship, Vittorio Emanuele married Swiss biscuit heiress and world-ranked water skier Marina Doria in Tehran, Iran, on 7 October 1971, at the occasion of the 2,500-year celebration of the Persian Empire. Coincidentally, Vittorio Emanuele and his wife Marina share a birthday (12 February) but Vittorio Emanuele is two years younger than Marina (she was born in 1935).

Vittorio Emanuele has worked as a banker and an aircraft salesman, and then an arms dealer.

Vittorio Emanuele has one son, Prince Emanuele Filiberto of Savoy, Prince of Venice, born on 22 June 1972, who has two daughters.

Duke of Savoy
On 7 July 2006 Vittorio Emanuele's kinsman and dynastic rival, Amedeo, 5th Duke of Aosta declared himself to be the head of the House of Savoy and Duke of Savoy, claiming that Vittorio Emanuele had lost his dynastic rights when he married without the permission of Umberto II in 1971. Amedeo has received the support of the President of the Council of the Senators of the Kingdom Aldo Alessandro Mola.

Vittorio Emanuele and his son have applied for a judicial injunction to forbid Amedeo from using the title "Duke of Savoy". In February 2010, the court of Arezzo ruled that the Duke of Aosta and his son must pay damages totalling €50,000 to their cousins and cease using the surname Savoy instead of Savoy-Aosta. However, the verdict was overturned on appeal, with the court of second resort allowing Amedeo the use of the short surname, in the form of di Savoia, and additionally revoking the financial penalty originally imposed on him.

Dynastic Orders of Savoy 
Vittorio Emanuele is the Grandmaster of the Dynastic Orders of Savoy which consist of: 
 House of Savoy: Royal Supreme Order of the Most Holy Annunciation
  House of Savoy: Royal Order of Saints Maurice and Lazarus
  House of Savoy: Royal Order of the Crown
  House of Savoy: Royal Civil Order of Savoy
  House of Savoy: Royal Military Order of Savoy
Vittorio assumed the title of Grandmaster in 1983 when his father Umberto II of Italy passed away.

Exile from and return to Italy

Reasons for exile 
In line with certain other countries that were formerly monarchies (such as France or Romania), the Italian Constitution required all male members of the House of Savoy to leave Italy and barred them from ever returning to Italian soil again. This was enacted as a "temporary disposition" enacted when the constitution was promulgated in 1948. The constitution also forbade any amendment that would change the republican form of government, effectively foreclosing any effort to restore the monarchy short of adopting a new constitution.

Requests for return 
Vittorio Emanuele lobbied the Parliament of Italy over the years in which the law prohibiting his return was in force, to be allowed to return to his homeland after 56 years in exile. In 1999, he filed a case at the European Court of Human Rights, in which the Prince charged that his lengthy exile violated his human rights. In September 2001, the court decided to hold a hearing on the case at a date later to be fixed.

In order to achieve a return to his homeland, he renounced any claim to the defunct throne and to Italy's crown jewels. He publicly assured the Italian government that the nation and the crown properties, confiscated by the State in 1946, "are no longer ours", referring to the House of Savoy. "For that matter we have no claim on the Crown jewels", he said. "We have nothing in Italy and we are not asking for anything". Vittorio Emanuele also dropped his case at the European Court of Human Rights. In February 2002, Vittorio Emanuele and his son Emanuele Filiberto wrote a signed letter, published through a law firm, in which they formally expressed their loyalty to the Constitution of Italy.

Return to Italy 
On 23 October 2002, the provision in the constitution that barred male members of the former royal house from returning to Italy was repealed. As part of a deal with the government, Vittorio Emanuele signed an agreement renouncing all claims to the defunct throne and recognizing the Republic as the only lawful government of Italy. Vittorio Emanuele was permitted to re-enter the country from 10 November 2002. On 23 December 2002, he made his first trip home in over half a century. On the one-day visit he, his wife and his son had a 20-minute audience with Pope John Paul II at the Vatican.

Upon their first visit in 2003 to Naples, where Vittorio Emanuele was born, and from where his family sailed into exile in 1946, the reception of the Savoys was mixed; most people were indifferent to them, some hostile, a few supportive. The media reported that many in Naples were not happy to see the return of the family, when hundreds of noisy demonstrators chanted negative slogans as they progressed through the city. Demonstrations were staged by two traditionally opposing factions: anti-monarchists on one hand, and supporters of the House of Bourbon-Two Sicilies, the royal house deposed when Italy was united in 1861 under the House of Savoy.

Controversies

Unilateral declaration of kingship (1969) 

Vittorio Emanuele unilaterally declared himself King of Italy on 15 December 1969. He argued that by agreeing to submit to a referendum on his place as head of state, his father had thereby abdicated. Vittorio Emanuele took this action after his father allegedly called for Amedeo, 5th Duke of Aosta to visit him in Portugal to name him his heir. Under his self-assumed powers as King of Italy, Vittorio Emanuele conferred the title of Duchess of Sant'Anna di Valdieri on his then fiancée, Marina Doria.

Dirk Hamer's death (1978–2015) 

On the night of 17 August or the morning of 18 August 1978, on the island of Cavallo (which lies off the south coast of Corsica), Vittorio Emanuele discovered his yacht's rubber dinghy had been taken and attached to another nearby yacht. Arming himself with a rifle, he attempted to board the vessel. He shot at a passenger he had awakened; the shot missed the passenger but mortally wounded Dirk Hamer (the 19-year-old son of Ryke Geerd Hamer), a passenger sleeping on the deck of another adjacent yacht. The prince admitted civil liability for the death in a letter dated 28 August 1978. Dirk Hamer died of his wounds on 7 December 1978, and Vittorio Emanuele was arrested.

On 11 October 1989, Vittorio Emanuele was indicted on charges of inflicting lethal injury and possession of a dangerous weapon. However, on 18 November 1991, after thirteen years of legal proceedings, the Paris Assize Court acquitted him of the fatal wounding and unintentional homicide charges, finding him guilty only of unauthorised possession of an M1 Garand rifle. He received a six-month suspended prison sentence.

When incarcerated in June 2006, on unconnected charges of corruption (see below, Arrest and imprisonment), Vittorio Emanuele was recorded admitting that "I was in the wrong, [...] but I must say I fooled them [the French judges]", leading to a call from Dirk Hamer's sister Birgit for Vittorio Emanuele to be retried in Italy for killing her brother.

Birgit Hamer undertook a long legal fight to obtain the full video. She stated: "What for us is a confession is a boast for him: he laughs about the fact that he killed a boy." The story of the video was broken by aristocratic journalist Beatrice Borromeo, who also wrote the preface for a book on the murder,  by Birgit Hamer. Vittorio Emanuele sued the newspaper for defamation, claiming the video had been manipulated. In 2015, a court judgement ruled in favor of the newspaper. On Twitter Borromeo posted:  ("Winning a case is always nice, but against Victor Emmanuel of Savoy the pleasure is double"), which resulted in a spat on Twitter with his son Emanuele Filiberto.

Allegations of anti-semitism (2003) 

Vittorio Emanuele also said in 2003 that the anti-Semitic laws passed under Mussolini's regime were "not that terrible". In response, the president of the Union of Italian Jewish Communities, Amos Luzzatto, stated that "I'm not saying it was he who signed the racial laws in 1938. But, as a Savoy heir, Victor Emmanuel has never distanced himself from them," in an interview with  newspaper.

Arrest and imprisonment (2006) 

On 16 June 2006, Vittorio Emanuele was arrested in Varenna and imprisoned in Potenza on charges of corruption and recruitment of prostitutes for clients of the Casinò di Campione of Campione d'Italia.

The enquiry was conducted by Italian magistrate John Woodcock, of British ancestry, famous for other VIPs' arrests.

After several days, Vittorio Emanuele was released and placed under house-arrest instead. He was released from house-arrest on 20 July 2006, but had to stay within the borders of Italy. Vittorio Emanuele was acquitted of all charges in the years 2007 and 2010.

 reported in 2006 that Emanuele Filiberto had distanced himself from his father.

Seeking compensation from Italy (2007)
In 2007, Vittorio Emanuele and his son, Emanuele Filiberto, requested formally that the state pay financial damages of €260 million, and initiate full restitution of all properties and belongings that had been confiscated from the royal house after the abolition of the monarchy. The financial damages claim is based on having suffered moral injustice during the exile. The Italian government has rejected the request and, in response, indicated that it may seek damages for historic grievances.

Honours

National dynastic honours
  House of Savoy: Sovereign Knight Grand Collar of the Royal Supreme Order of the Most Holy Annunciation
  House of Savoy: Sovereign Knight Grand Cordon of the Royal Order of Saints Maurice and Lazarus
  House of Savoy: Sovereign Knight Grand Cordon of the Royal Order of the Crown
  House of Savoy: Sovereign of the Royal Civil Order of Savoy
  House of Savoy: Sovereign of the Royal Military Order of Savoy
  House of Savoy: Sovereign of the Royal Order of Merit of Savoy

National honours
  Sovereign Military Order of Malta: Bailiff Knight Grand Cross of Justice of the Sovereign Military Order of Malta, Special Class
  Two Sicilian Royal Family: Bailiff Knight Grand Cross with Collar of Justice of the Two Sicilian Royal Sacred Military Constantinian Order of Saint George

Foreign honours
  Greek Royal Family: Knight Grand Cross of the Royal Order of the Redeemer
 : Knight Grand Cross of the Order of Saint-Charles
  Montenegrin Royal Family: Knight of the Order of Petrovic Njegos
  Montenegrin Royal Family: Knight Grand Cross of the Royal Order of Prince Danilo I
  Montenegrin Royal Family: Knight of the Order of Saint Peter of Cetinje
  Empire of Iran: Recipient of the Commemorative Medal of the 2,500 year celebration of the Persian Empire

Ancestry

Patrilineal descent

Vittorio Emanuele's patriline is the line from which he is descended father to son.

Patrilineal descent is the principle behind membership in royal houses, as it can be traced back through the generations, which means that Vittorio Emanuele is a member of the House of Savoy.

House of Savoy

Umberto I, Count of Savoy, c. 980–about 1047/1048
Otto I, Count of Savoy, about 1010/1020–c. 1057
Amadeus II, Count of Savoy, c. 1050–1080
Umberto II, Count of Savoy, 1065–1103
Amadeus III, Count of Savoy, 1095–1148
Umberto III, Count of Savoy, 1135–1189
Thomas I, Count of Savoy, 1178–1233
Thomas, Count of Savoy, Lord of Piedmont, 1199–1259
Amadeus V, Count of Savoy, 1253–1323
Aymon, Count of Savoy, 1291–1343
Amadeus VI, Count of Savoy, 1334–1383
Amadeus VII, Count of Savoy, 1360–1391
Amadeus VIII, Duke of Savoy, 1383–1451
Louis, Duke of Savoy, 1413–1465
Philip II, Duke of Savoy, 1438–1497
Charles III, Duke of Savoy, 1486–1553
Emmanuel Philibert, Duke of Savoy, 1528–1580
Charles Emmanuel I, Duke of Savoy, 1562–1630
Thomas Francis, Prince of Carignano, 1596–1656
Emmanuel Philibert, Prince of Carignano, 1628–1709
Victor Amadeus I, Prince of Carignano, 1690–1741
Louis Victor, Prince of Carignano, 1721–1778
Victor Amadeus II, Prince of Carignano, 1743–1780
Charles Emmanuel, Prince of Carignano, 1770–1800
Charles Albert of Sardinia, 1798–1849
Victor Emmanuel II of Italy, 1820–1878
Umberto I of Italy, 1844–1900
Victor Emmanuel III of Italy, 1869–1947
Umberto II of Italy, 1904–1983
Vittorio Emanuele, Prince of Naples, b. 1937

References

Bibliography

External links

Official web page of House of Savoy
Genealogy of recent members of the House of Savoy.
A web page about the prince.
On the murder of Dirk Hamer (In Italian language)

1937 births
Living people
Princes of Savoy
Princes of Piedmont
Nobility from Naples
Claimant Kings of Jerusalem
Heirs apparent who never acceded
Pretenders to the Italian throne
Italian princes
Arms traders
Italian exiles
Italian Roman Catholics

Recipients of the Order of Saints Maurice and Lazarus
Knights Grand Cross of the Order of Saints Maurice and Lazarus
Recipients of the Order of the Crown (Italy)
Knights of Malta
Recipients of the Order of Saint-Charles
Grand Crosses of the Order of Saint-Charles
People acquitted of murder
People acquitted of corruption
People acquitted of racketeering
Sons of kings